Edmund Freibauer (20 February 1937 – 29 November 2022) was an Austrian professor and politician. A member of the Austrian People's Party, he served as president of the Landtag of Lower Austria from 1998 to 2008.

Freibauer died on 29 November 2022, at the age of 85.

References

1937 births
2022 deaths
Presidents of the Landtag of Lower Austria
Members of the Landtag of Lower Austria
20th-century Austrian people
Members of Landtags in Austria
Austrian People's Party politicians
University of Vienna alumni
Cartellverband members
Knights Commander of the Order of St Gregory the Great
People from Gänserndorf District